Dzulmi Eldin (born July 4, 1960) is the mayor of Medan, North Sumatra. A graduate of Satyagama University's Masters program, he started his career in the government as a section chief in Deli Serdang Regency administration in 1992, before slowly rising in rank to become the city secretary of Medan by 2007. In 2010, he was elected as deputy mayor prior the removal of sitting mayor in 2013, after which he was elevated to the mayor rank. He ran in the 2015 local elections, managing to secure 340,406 votes (71.72%).

He was arrested by the Corruption Eradication Commission on 16 October 2019.

References

Golkar politicians
1960 births
Living people
People from Medan
Mayors of Medan